Abacetus semibrunneus is a species of ground beetle in the subfamily Pterostichinae. It was described by Straneo in 1988.

References

semibrunneus
Beetles described in 1988